Represented by a single specimen, the Mount Elgon mole shrew (Surdisorex schlitteri) is a species of African mole shrew known to date only from the ericaceous zone of Mount Elgon in Western Kenya. It was described as the third member of the genus Surdisorex by Kerbis Peterhans in 2009. On the basis of skull length measurements, Surdisorex schlitteri is intermediate between S. norae and S. polulus in size. The scientific name honors Duane Schlitter, in recognition of his substantial contributions to the understanding of African small mammals and his longstanding support of Kenyan scientific research. The Mount Elgon mole shrew is listed as "data deficient" because it is only known from a single specimen.

The genus Surdisorex represents Kenya's only endemic genus of mammal and, prior to the description of the Mount Elgon mole shrew, the genus included two species from the highlands of central Kenya: the Aberdare mole shrew (S. norae) restricted to the Aberdare Range and the Mount Kenya mole shrew (S. polulus) restricted to Mount Kenya.

References

Shrews
Surdisorex
Mammals of Kenya
Endemic fauna of Kenya